Derek O’Brien (born 13 March 1961) is an Indian politician, television personality and quiz master. He is a Member of Parliament in the Rajya Sabha (Upper House of India's Parliament) from West Bengal and member of the All India Trinamool Congress. He is the chief national spokesperson as well as leader of the Trinamool Congress Parliamentary party in the Rajya Sabha. Prior to his Parliamentary career, he became well known as the quizmaster for the Bournvita Quiz Contest and other shows.

Personal background 
O’Brien comes from an Irish family and can trace his paternal origins to an Irish soldier who came to India in the early 1860s and whose descendants married into the Bengali community. O’Brien is based in Kolkata and speaks, reads and writes Bengali. O’Brien's grandfather, Amos O’Brien, was the first Christian to serve as head of the Department of English, Banaras Hindu University, and also taught at Ravenshaw College in Cuttack.

O'Brien went to St. Xavier's Collegiate School in Kolkata and for a short period, St. Columba's School in Delhi, and then spent two years at Scottish Church College, Kolkata. O’Brien is the oldest of three sons of Joyce and Neil O’Brien (19342016). Neil O'Brien worked in publishing and retired as the chairman and managing director of Oxford University Press India as well as leading the Anglo-Indian community for two decades.

He is married to Tonuca Basu, who is practising medicine in Brooklyn, New York. He was earlier married to Rila Banerjee  and the couple have a daughter Aanya.

Professional and quizzing career 
O’Brien's first job was as a journalist at Sportsworld magazine. After a short stint there, he joined the advertising agency Ogilvy in 1984 and became its Creative Head for Kolkata and Delhi. Simultaneously, he embarked on a career as a quizmaster and quiz show host, having been introduced to quizzing by his father, Neil O’Brien, who had conducted the first open quiz in India in 1967. In 1988, O’Brien hosted his first all-India quizzes as a professional quizmaster: the Bata North Star Quiz and the Maggi Quiz for Schools. In 1990, he joined hands with Economic Times for the Brand Equity Quiz for business corporations. In 1991, he finally quit Ogilvy and set up his own knowledge, education and publishing company, Big Ideas – since renamed Derek O’Brien and Associates.

Derek O’Brien has conducted quizzes in the UAE (Dubai and Abu Dhabi), Bahrain, Kuwait, Qatar, Oman, Singapore, Sri Lanka, Bangladesh and the United States. In 2008, he travelled to Pakistan to host a television quiz for schools from Islamabad, Lahore and Karachi. For three years in a row (2003–05), O’Brien won the Indian Television Academy award for Best Host in a Television Gameshow.

O’Brien has spoken at, among others, Harvard, Yale and Columbia Universities in the United States as well as several Indian Institutes of Management (IIMs) and Indian Institutes of Technology (IITs), the National Law School of India University, Bengaluru, Hindu College, and Shri Ram College of Commerce in Delhi, and Loreto College, Kolkata.

He has served as president of the Dalhousie Institute Club.

Political career 
O’Brien joined the Trinamool Congress in 2004, when the party was still in opposition in West Bengal. He later wrote that he was drawn to the charisma and personality of the Trinamool Congress leader (now chief minister of Bengal) Mamata Banerjee, and felt she was the only one who could defeat the then CPI(M)-led government in the state.

Spokesperson for the Trinamool Congress 
O’Brien soon became a spokesperson for the Trinamool Congress and was identified as the rare white-collar, English-speaking politician in the party. He came to national media attention during Mamata Banerjee's protest against the CPI(M) government's land acquisition attempt in Singur (2006), and then in the run-up to the 2009 Lok Sabha election, in which Trinamool Congress handed the CPI(M) its first defeat in West Bengal since 1977. He pioneered his party's social media outreach.

O’Brien is frequently seen on news television shows and is a regular commentator on political and policy issues. He wrote a weekly column for NDTV and his articles have appeared in Times of India, Hindustan Times and Indian Express.

In 2011, following the Trinamool Congress victory in the West Bengal assembly election, O’Brien was sent to the Rajya Sabha.

First term in Rajya Sabha
He was sworn in as Member of Parliament on 19 August 2011  and is one of 16 MPs elected to the Rajya Sabha from West Bengal. In 2012, Trinamool Congress named him as its Chief Whip in the Rajya Sabha.

In 2012, O'Brien cast a vote in the presidential election to elect the 13th President of India. His vote is believed to be the first presidential vote cast by an elected member of the Anglo-Indian community—as members of the community have previously been nominated to the Lok Sabha and other assemblies and are not eligible to vote.

In 2012, he addressed the United Nations General Assembly as a member of the Indian parliamentary delegation.

Parliamentary Committee assignments 
He was the Chairman of the Department-related Parliamentary Standing Committee on Transport, Tourism and Culture, from September 1, 2017, to September 12, 2019. Presently, he serves as a member on the following key parliamentary committees - General Purposes Committee, Business Advisory Committee, Ethics Committee, Transport, Tourism and Culture Committee, Human Resource Development Committee. He served on the Railway Convention Committee  and has also been a member of parliamentary select (specific issue) committees  on the Goods and Services Tax Constitutional Amendment Bill, the Insurance Bill, the Land Acquisition Bill, the Citizenship Act Amendment Bill. He has spoken in Parliament on a range of issues, from demonetisation, to net neutrality, Jammu and Kashmir, railways and juvenile justice, and participated in the discussion on the Motion of Thanks to the President of India's address to Parliament.

Second term in Rajya Sabha
His second term as an MP of the Rajya Sabha began on 19 August 2017 and is slated to end on 18 August 2023.

On 20 September 2020, when the Farm Reform Bill was placed in the Rajya Sabha for passage,  Derek O’Brien protested, tore and threw the Rule Book as he, along with other members, heckled the Deputy Chairman of the Rajya Sabha Harivansh Narayan Singh. Apparently, in the ensuing melee with other members also protesting, and papers being flung in protest towards the deputy chairman, then the Rule Book in question was torn by Derek O’Brien. Media verifiable sources mention that the house was under complete chaos and unrest to protest the bill. This chaos led to a 10-minute suspension of the house. Ministry of Parliamentary Affairs sought his suspension, along with some other members, as a consequence for his actions under rule 256 of procedure and conduct of business. He along with eight other MPs were suspended for one week on account of his unruly and unparliamemtary behaviour.

He was suspended once again on 21 December 2021 for allegations of throwing a rulebook, as he was protesting against the Elections Law (Amendment) Bill, 2021.

Parliamentary Committees 
He is a member of the Parliamentary Standing Committee on Home Affairs. On 6 January 2022 he wrote to Anand Sharma, head of the committee to discuss the secret app "Tek Fog" that "has serious ramifications and could jeopardise national security". He wrote, "This application is capable of penetrating encrypted messaging platforms and secure social media conversations, in order to heavily manipulate and exploit narratives on said platforms."

Other work 
O’Brien is also a celebrated author. His books include the bestseller, Inside Parliament: Views for the Front Row, Derek Introduces the Constitution and Parliament of India, My Way, a motivational book, Speak Up Speak Out, a compilation of elocution pieces, and several reference, quiz and text books.

References

External links
Official website
Derek O Brien at PRS Legislative Research
Derek O'Brien at Penguin India

1961 births
Trinamool Congress politicians from West Bengal
Living people
Indian television presenters
Politicians from Kolkata
Indian Christians
Scottish Church College alumni
University of Calcutta alumni
Indian people of Irish descent
St. Columba's School, Delhi alumni
Rajya Sabha members from West Bengal
Anglo-Indian people